is a Vocaloid by Internet Co., Ltd. Her voice is sampled by Megumi Nakajima. The mascot of the software is called  (stylized as GUMI). She is also sometimes called Megpoid GUMI, or GUMI Megpoid.

The name "Gumi" is the voice provider Megumi Nakajima's nickname from her childhood. The software name, "Megpoid", was taken from the provider's name, "Megumi." The second half, the "poid", is short for "like Vocaloid," the full implied name of this product is "Megumi-like Vocaloid."

Development
Gumi was developed by Internet Co., Ltd. using Yamaha Corporation's Vocaloid 2 synthesizer software. Her voice was created by taking vocal samples from singer Megumi Nakajima at a controlled pitch and tone.

On December 11, 2010, the president of Internet Co. announced that Gackpoid, Megpoid, and Lily would be distributed in Taiwan.

Additional software
On October 21, 2011, a new version of the software, called "V3 Megpoid", was released containing a package of four different tones of Gumi's voice for Vocaloid 3: Adult, Power, Sweet, and Whisper. This was one of the first 4 packages released on the same day for the new engine, the others being Mew, SeeU and VY1V3.  This was originally going to be an expansion pack for the Vocaloid 2 version of Gumi under the name of "Megpoid Extend" and was based on the "Append" vocals of Crypton Future Media.  On March 16, 2012, an update of the Vocaloid 2 Megpoid was released, called "V3 Megpoid - Native". On February 28, 2013, another new version of Gumi, called "Megpoid English" was released also for the Vocaloid 3 engine.

On November 5, 2015, an update to the V3 Megpoid package, called "Megpoid V4", was released for the Vocaloid 4 engine updating the vocals from V3 Megpoid and V3 Megpoid - Native along with adding alternative versions to the vocals including: MellowAdult, PowerFat, NaturalSweet, SoftWhisper, and NativeFat. These vocals made use of the new Vocaloid 4 feature "Cross-Synthesis". Vocaloid 4 Cross Synthesis was also allowed for the Vocaloid 3 version of the Megpoid software, though was restricted only to working with the 5 Vocaloid 3 Japanese vocals. Noboru responded that the English bank for Vocaloid 4 would be updated at a later time but there is currently no schedule. When asked about what this meant, Noboru replied "this year or next" (2016/2017). In regards to making more than 1 vocal, he noted this may be too difficult.

The voice was also featured in use on the Vocaloid Keyboard prototype.

In addition, an unrelated Vocaloid product called "Megpoid Talk" was developed which allowed Megpoid speech.

"Native" and "English" were released for the Mobile Vocaloid Editor.

She was also set to have a "Falsetto" vocal. Due to issues with balancing the vocal with the normal vocals, it was dropped and a Vocaloid called "Kokone" was developed instead with Falsetto capabilities.

Volume 3 of the Vocaloid-P Data Series was also dedicated to the Megpoid V3 software.

On October 13, 2022, AI Megpoid was released on the Vocaloid 6 engine as an AI voicebank with Japanese and English language support, alongside Mandarin Chinese, which is not advertised.

Reception
Gumi initially struggled to build popularity against the Crypton Future Media's Character Vocal series and was considered to be "nothing special" when first released. She was, however, quicker to gain popularity in comparison to Camui Gackpo.

By 2010, Gumi's popularity was on par with Crypton Future Media's Vocaloids and had out sold her predecessor Camui Gackpo, becoming the most popular and well known non-Crypton Vocaloid. In 2011, her usage grew and in a number of weeks she would have even more songs in the top 100 rankings than some of the Crypton Future Media vocalists. In January 2015, a popularity poll was released, confirming Gumi was the second most popular Vocaloid of 2015 on Niconico.

Gumi has so far over 300 known songs and one of her songs titled "", by DECO*27, is considered one of her most popular songs with over 10,000,000 views on Nico Nico.

Concerning Gumi's age, during the Extend, Noboru once tweeted that there was a rough age preferred for Gumi, set around the teenage years. However, no official age was ever given to Gumi in her various designs. When writing about the Extend, it was noted the voice could be considered 'extensions' of the age conceptualized for Gumi.

Marketing

Manga/anime
Gumi has appeared in several manga based series. The bi-monthly Vocaloid magazine, Comic@loid, has released some titles, and others have not been released yet. The released titles include Mozaik Role, Kiritorisen, Shiryoku Kensa, Setsuna Trip, Ringo Uri no Utakata Shoujo, and Yowamushi Montblanc.

Another manga is Gumi from Vocaloid which ran from 2013 to 2014. This particular manga is not based on a specific song, but rather on Gumi's adventures as a Vocaloid.

Another manga which appeared in 2014, which stars Gumi. This features the fictional birth story of "Gumi", who was a girl who becomes an Android and debuts as an idol. The story focuses on her and a mysterious team called  . Fellow Vocaloids Camui Gackpo, Lily and Cul, also feature in the manga.

Gumi stars in an anime television short series called Koi Suru Dessan Ningyō, named after a song by sasakure.UK on which the short is based. Masanori Okamoto is responsible for many aspects of this project including the script and filming of the short.  If the short is popular a series will follow.

Video game
Gumi starred in her game . Both a standard and limited edition were released on March 28, 2013.

She also appears as a special guest in several songs  in Hatsune Miku and Future Stars: Project Mirai and its sequel.

Competition
In May 2012, a song contest was announced for Gumi, which was hosted by CreoFUGA. Producers entering the contest could use any Vocaloid 2 or Vocaloid 3 Gumi voicebank.

A contest was held by VocaloTracks in 2013 to create an original song using any of Gumi's voicebank. They were able to sell their songs under a "professional label".

Another song contest was run, linking with the release of her English vocal.

See also
 List of Vocaloid products

References

External links

  

Vocaloids introduced in 2009
Fictional singers
Japanese idols
Japanese popular culture